Lower Reservoir is a small reservoir in Otsego County, New York, located north of Oneonta. It is the source of municipal water for the City of Oneonta. Lower Reservoir drains south via Oneonta Creek which flows into the Susquehanna River.

References 

Lakes of New York (state)
Lakes of Otsego County, New York